The 2018 Oregon State Beavers football team represented Oregon State University during the 2018 NCAA Division I FBS football season. The team played their home games on campus at Reser Stadium in Corvallis, Oregon as a member of the North Division of the Pac-12 Conference. They were led by first-year head coach Jonathan Smith. The schedule was released on November 16, 2017. The Beavers finished the season with a 2–10 record. They went 1–8 in Pac-12 play and finished in last place in the North Division.

Previous season
The Beavers finished the 2017 season 1–11, 0–9 in Pac-12 play to finish in last place in the North Division. The Beavers entered the season with Gary Andersen as coach in his third year. After his squad opened with losses in five of their first six games, with their only win against Portland State, Andersen resigned and was replaced by interim head coach Cory Hall for the remainder of the season.

Preseason

Award watch lists
Listed in the order that they were released

Pac-12 Media Days
The 2018 Pac-12 media days were on July 25, 2018 in Hollywood, California. Oregon State was represented by Jonathan Smith (HC), Blake Brandel (OL) & Kee Whetzel (LB) at Pac-12 Media Days. The Pac-12 media poll was released with the Beavers predicted to finish in last place in the North Division.

Schedule

Game summaries

at Ohio State

Southern Utah

at Nevada

Turnover Chainsaw

Arizona

at Arizona State

Washington State

California

at Colorado

USC

at Stanford

at Washington

Oregon

Awards
Pac-12 Freshman Offensive Player of the Year: Jermar Jefferson

References

Oregon State
Oregon State Beavers football seasons
Oregon State Beavers football